WOW Worship: Green is a compilation album of Christian music. It reached #78 on the Billboard 200 chart.  The album was certified as gold in the US in 2002 by the Recording Industry Association of America (RIAA).  It was certified as gold in Canada in 2003 by the Canadian Recording Industry Association (CRIA).

Track listing

Disc one 

 "Rise Up and Praise Him"
 written by Paul Baloche and Gary Sadler
 performed by The Women of Faith Worship Team from Integrity Music
 from Outrageous Joy, released 1999-01-26
 live recording from 04/01/1998 at Nashville Arena, Nashville, Tennessee, USA
 "All Things Are Possible"
 written by Darlene Zschech
 performed by Darlene Zschech
 from Shout to the Lord 2000, released 1998-12-29
 live recording from 07/06/1998-07/19/1998 at State Sports Centre, Sydney Olympic Park, New South Wales, Australia
 "Trading My Sorrows"
 written by Darrell Evans
 performed by Darrell Evans
 from Only God for Me, released 1999-06-29
 live recording from 1998 at Integrity Songwriter Summit, Mobile, Alabama
 "Every Move I Make"
 written by David Ruis
 performed by David Ruis
 from Touching the Father's Heart, released 1997-01-02
 live recording from Jubilee Place, Winnipeg, Manitoba, Canada
 "That's Why We Praise Him"
 written by Tommy Walker
 performed by Rich Ochoa and the Maranatha! Promise Band
 from PK2000 - Go the Distance, released 2000-09-12
 "We Fall Down"
 written by Chris Tomlin
 performed by The Passion Worship Band
 from Passion: Live Worship from the 286 Generation, released 1998-07-20
 live recording from 01/01/1998-01/04/1998 at Austin Convention Center, Austin, Texas, USA
 "Unashamed Love"
 written by Lamont Hierbert
 performed by Ten Shekel Shirt
 from Much, released 2001-04-03
 "He Knows My Name"
 written by Tommy Walker
 performed by Peter Shambrook
 from Dry Bones Dancing, released 1997-12-07
 "Hallelujah" (Your Love Is Amazing)
 written by Brenton Brown and Brian Doerksen
 performed by Brenton Brown
 from Surrender, released 2000-10-01
 "Lord Reign in Me"
 written by Brenton Brown
 performed by Brenton Brown
 from Winds of Worship #12 - Live from London, released 1998
 live recording from 02/22/1998 at Elliot School Auditorium, Putney, London Borough of Wandsworth, London, Greater London, England, United Kingdom
 "My Redeemer Lives"
 written by Reuben Morgan
 performed by Darlene Zschech
 from Shout to the Lord 2000, released 1998-12-29
 live recording from 07/06/1998-07/19/1998 at State Sports Centre, Sydney Olympic Park, New South Wales, Australia
 "Fuel"
 written by Tom Wuest
 performed by Analogue
 from Fuel, released 2001-09-11
 "You're Worthy of My Praise"
 written by David Ruis
 performed by The Praise Band
 from Praise Band 9 - Forever, released 1999-11-09
 "Breathe"
 written by Marie Barnett
 performed by Kathryn Scott
 from Hungry, released 1999-03-01
 live recording from Elliot School Auditorium, Putney, London Borough of Wandsworth, London, Greater London, England, United Kingdom
 "Agnus Dei"
 written by Michael W. Smith
 performed by Charlie Hall and The Passion Worship Band
 from Passion: Better Is One Day, released 2000-03-14
 live recording from 01/01/1999-01/04/1999 at Fort Worth Convention Center, Fort Worth, Texas, USA
 "Shout to the North"
 written by Martin Smith
 performed by Delirious?
 from Cutting Edge, released 1995-05-15

Disc two 

 "The Doxology"
 written by Ken Thomas, new bridge by Tommy Walker
 performed by Tommy Walker and the Maranatha! Promise Band
 from PK2000 - Go the Distance, released 2000-09-12
 live recording at Calvary Chapel Costa Mesa, California, United States 
 "He Is Exalted"
 written by Twila Paris
 performed by Twila Paris
 from Kingdom Seekers, released 1985-09-25
 "Hosanna"
 written by Carl Tuttle
 performed by Carl Tuttle
 from Change My Heart Oh God, released 1996-08-20
 live recording
 "Cry of My Heart"
 written by Terry Butler
 performed by Terry Butler
 from Change My Heart Oh God Vol. 2, released 1997-04-22
 live recording at The Group of Project Studios, Vancouver, British Columbia, Canada 
 "Good to Me"
 written by Craig Musseau
 performed by Brian Doerksen
 from Change My Heart Oh God Vol. 2, released 1997-04-22
 live recording at The Group of Project Studios, Vancouver, British Columbia, Canada 
 "The Power of Your Love"
 written by Geoff Bullock
 performed by Darlene Zschech
 from Shout to the Lord, released 1996-04-30
 live recording from 01/01/1996 at Hills Christian Life Centre, Baulkham Hills, New South Wales, Australia (later Hillsong)
 "Awesome in This Place"
 written by Dave Billington
 performed by Gary Sadler and Kelly Willard
 from Thy Word, released 1994
" I Worship You Almighty God"
 written by Sondra Corbett Wood
 performed by Lisa Glasgow
 from Celebrate Jesus, released 2000-01-25
 "Seek Ye First"
 written by Karen Lafferty
 performed by The Maranatha! Singers
 from Praise 1 - The Praise Album, released 1999-08-23
 "Jesus, Draw Me Close"
 written by Rick Founds
 performed by Anne Barbour
 from The Silver Anniversary Project, released 1998-11-03
 "Great Is the Lord"
 written by Michael W. Smith and Deborah Smith
 performed by Michael W. Smith
 from Michael W. Smith Project, released 1983-02-08
 "Think About His Love"
 written by Walt Harrah
 performed by Don Moen
 from God for Us, released 1998-06-02
 "Draw Me Close"
 written by Kelly Carpenter
 performed by Andy Park
 from Change My Heart Oh God Vol. 2, released 1997-04-22
 live recording at The Project Group of Studios, Greater Vancouver, British Columbia, Canada
 "This Is Love"
 written by Terry Butler and Mike Young
 performed by Scott Underwood
 from Why We Worship: Intimacy, released 1998-12-22
 "Worthy, You Are Worthy"
 written by Don Moen
 performed by Don Moen
 from Give Thanks, released 1986
 live recording at Covenant Church, Mobile, Alabama, United States 
 "Come Just As You Are"
 written by Joseph Sabolick
 performed by Terry Clark and the Maranatha! Promise Band
 from PK2000 - Go the Distance, released 2000-09-12
 live recording at Calvary Chapel Costa Mesa in California, United States 
 "To Him Who Sits on the Throne"
 written by Debbye Graafsma
 performed by Kelly Willard
 from My Heart Rejoices, released 1995-10-31

References 

2001 compilation albums
WOW series albums